Iashivili is the Georgian surname, which may refer to:
 An alternative spelling of Yachvili
The Iashvili (family) 
Alexander Iashvili (born 1977), Georgian football player
Paolo Iashvili (1894–1937), Georgian poet
Sandro Iashvili (born 1985), Georgian football player
Dimitri Yachvili (born 1980), the French rugby player of Georgian origin
Michel Yachvili (born 1946), the French rugby player of Georgian origin

See also 
 Iashvili (family)

Georgian-language surnames